Carlos Milcíades Villalba Aquino (22 August 1924 – 8 January 2016) was a Catholic bishop.

Ordained to the priesthood in 1948, Villalba Aquino was named bishop of the Roman Catholic Diocese of San Juan Bautista  de las Misiones, Paraguay, in 1978 and retired in 1999.

Notes

1924 births
2016 deaths
20th-century Roman Catholic bishops in Paraguay
Roman Catholic bishops of San Juan Bautista de las Misiones